This article lists important figures and events in Malaysian public affairs during the year 1996, together with births and deaths of notable Malaysians.

Incumbent political figures

Federal level
Yang di-Pertuan Agong: Tuanku Jaafar
Raja Permaisuri Agong: Tuanku Najihah
Prime Minister: Dato' Sri Dr Mahathir Mohamad
Deputy Prime Minister: Dato' Sri Anwar Ibrahim
Chief Justice: Eusoff Chin

State level
 Sultan of Johor: Sultan Iskandar
 Sultan of Kedah: Sultan Abdul Halim Muadzam Shah
 Sultan of Kelantan: Sultan Ismail Petra
 Raja of Perlis: Tuanku Syed Putra
 Sultan of Perak: Sultan Azlan Shah
 Sultan of Pahang: Sultan Ahmad Shah
 Sultan of Selangor: Sultan Salahuddin Abdul Aziz Shah (Deputy Yang di-Pertuan Agong)
 Sultan of Terengganu: Sultan Mahmud Al-Muktafi Billah Shah
 Yang di-Pertuan Besar of Negeri Sembilan: Tunku Naquiyuddin (Regent)
 Yang di-Pertua Negeri (Governor) of Penang: Tun Dr Hamdan Sheikh Tahir
 Yang di-Pertua Negeri (Governor) of Malacca: Tun Syed Ahmad Al-Haj bin Syed Mahmud Shahabuddin
 Yang di-Pertua Negeri (Governor) of Sarawak: Tun Ahmad Zaidi Adruce Mohammed Noor
 Yang di-Pertua Negeri (Governor) of Sabah: Tun Sakaran Dandai

Events
 6 January – A landslide blocked the North–South Expressway (NSE) near Gua Tempurung, Perak.
 12 January – The first Malaysian satellite MEASAT 1 was launched by the Ariane rocket from Kourou, French Guiana.
 12 January – Seven year-old Tin Song Sheng reported missing while waiting for the bus at the Taman Rasah Chinese Primary School in Taman Melawati, Shah Alam, Selangor returned home. 
 17 January – Twenty-four people, seven of them policemen, were injured in rioting at the Sungai Besi camp for Vietnamese illegal immigrants.
 February – First Le Tour de Langkawi cycling tour.
 6 February – The ground-breaking ceremony of the PUTRA-LRT underground rail tunnel from Pasar Seni to Ampang Park.
 12 February – The Multimedia Super Corridor was established.
 2 March – The body of the Malay Sarawakian nationalist Rosli Dhobie was brought back from Kuching Central Prison to Sibu.
 6 March – The Perodua Rusa, Malaysian first domestically manufactured van was launched.
 29–31 March – 1996 Malaysian motorcycle Grand Prix
 18 April – The Sungai Besi camp for Vietnamese illegal immigrants is officially closed.
 May – Malaysia's first domestically produced motorcycle, Modenas Kriss was launched.
 May – The construction of the Bakun Dam projects began.
 2 July – A new version of Malaysian Ringgit RM 2 notes was introduced.
 16 July – A bus ferrying a group of factory workers and their families on a holiday excursion plunged into a 120m-deep ravine at km 1 of the Genting Sempah–Genting Highlands Highway near the Genting Highlands Resort, killing 17. Six were children.
 3 August – A widespread power outage in Peninsular Malaysia began at 5:17pm. The states of Peninsular Malaysia including Kuala Lumpur, Selangor, Putrajaya, Johor, Melaka, and Negeri Sembilan lost power for several hours. A transmission line near Sultan Ismail Power Station in Paka, Terengganu tripped at 5:17pm causing all power stations in Peninsular Malaysia to collapse resulting in a massive power failure. Supply was back to normal by 11:00pm. After this blackout, utility giant Tenaga Nasional's stock fell considerably.
 29 August – A mud avalanche near Pos Dipang Orang Asli settlement in Kampar, Perak killed 44 people.
8 September – Official opening of the Light Rail Transit System (Sistem Transit Aliran Ringan) (STAR LRT) Phase 1 from Sultan Ismail to Ampang.
 1 October – The Kuala Lumpur Tower at Bukit Nanas was officially opened by Prime Minister Mahathir Mohamad.
 8 October – The Malay political party, Semangat 46 was officially dissolved.
 27 October – Michael Jackson held his first concert in Malaysia at Merdeka Stadium, Kuala Lumpur.
 29 October – Michael Jackson performed for the second time in Kuala Lumpur, Malaysia
 2 November – The Sungai Buloh Prison in Sungai Buloh, Selangor became the federal prison, replacing Pudu Prison in Kuala Lumpur.
 29 November – Official opening of the new Pusat Sains Negara (National Science Centre) building in Bukit Damansara, Kuala Lumpur.
 18 December – The Yang di-Pertuan Muda of Terengganu, Tengku Mizan Zainal Abidin married Nur Zahirah.
26 December – Several parts of Sabah were hit by the Tropical Depression Greg. More than 120 people were killed.

Births
 5 January – Adam Nor Azlin  – Footballer
 14 June – Muhammad Ariff Farhan Mohd Isa – Footballer
 3 July – Kumaahran Sathasivam – Footballer
 4 August – Syazwan Andik – Footballer
 10 August – Ifwat Akmal – Footballer
 2 October – Ahmad Syihan Hazmi Mohamed – Footballer
 3 December – Muhammad Farhan Roslan – Footballer

Deaths
22 May – Wong Peng Soon — Former badminton player (born 1918)
19 Feb – P. P. Narayanan — Former Malaysian Workers Union president

See also
1996
1995 in Malaysia | 1997 in Malaysia
Years in Malaysia

References

 
Malaysia
Years of the 20th century in Malaysia
1990s in Malaysia
Malaysia